Gimmick is the second studio album by the American noise rock band Barkmarket, released on October 12, 1993 by American Recordings.

Reception

William Ruhlmann of allmusic gave it 4.5 out of 5 stars, calling it "hard rock in a near-industrial mode--all relentlessly pounding drums and bass, relentlessy chording guitars, relentlessly ranting vocals."

Track listing

Personnel
Adapted from the Gimmick liner notes.

Barkmarket
John Nowlin – bass guitar
Dave Sardy – lead vocals, guitar, banjo, tape, production, recording, mixing
Rock Savage – drums, percussion

Additional musicians
Doug Henderson – wasp synthesizer (3)
Jane Scarpantoni – cello (12)
Production and additional personnel
Greg Gordon – mixing
Howie Weinberg – mastering

Release history

References

External links 
 

1993 albums
American Recordings (record label) albums
Barkmarket albums
Albums produced by Dave Sardy